{{Speciesbox
| image = Abatus philippii - Heart urchins from the depths - Figure 6 (cropped).png
| image_caption = C. Aboral view of Abatus philippii Lovén, 1871 
| genus = Abatus
| species = philippii
| authority = (Lovén, 1871) <ref name=worms>{{cite WoRMS |author=Kroh, A. |year=2012 |title='Abatus philippii Lovén, 1871|id=160768 |accessdate=1 November 2012 |db=echinoidea}}</ref>
}}Abatus philippii is a species of sea urchin of the family Schizasteridae. Their armour is covered with spines. It is in the genus Abatus and lives in the oceans of the southern hemisphere. Abatus philippii'' was first scientifically described in 1871 by Sven Lovén.

References 

Spatangoida
Animals described in 1971